German submarine U-397 was a Type VIIC U-boat of Nazi Germany's Kriegsmarine during World War II.

She carried out one patrol. She did not sink or damage any ships.

She was scuttled in northern Germany on 5 May 1945.

Design
German Type VIIC submarines were preceded by the shorter Type VIIB submarines. U-397 had a displacement of  when at the surface and  while submerged. She had two shafts and two  propellers.

U-397 was fitted with five  torpedo tubes (four fitted at the bow and one at the stern), fourteen torpedoes, one  SK C/35 naval gun, (220 rounds), one  Flak M42 and two twin  C/30 anti-aircraft guns. The boat had a complement of between forty-four and sixty.

Service history
The submarine was laid down on 29 August 1942 at the Howaldtswerke (yard) at Kiel as yard number 29, launched on 6 October 1943 and commissioned on 20 November under the command of Oberleutnant zur See Fritz Kallipke.

She served with the 5th U-boat Flotilla from 20 November 1943 and the 7th flotilla from 1 June of the same year. She was reassigned to the 23rd flotilla on 1 July 1944, then the 31st flotilla on 20 February 1945.

The boat's first patrol was preceded by the short journey from Kiel in Germany to Stavanger, arriving at the Norwegian port on 2 June 1944.

Patrol
U-397 departed Stavanger on 8 June 1944 and arrived back there on the 24th.

The boat moved back to Kiel on 4 July 1944.

Fate
The submarine was scuttled on 5 May 1945 in Geltinger Bucht (east of Flensburg).

References

Bibliography

External links

German Type VIIC submarines
U-boats commissioned in 1943
1943 ships
Ships built in Kiel
World War II submarines of Germany
Operation Regenbogen (U-boat)
Maritime incidents in May 1945